Kokkolan jäähalli is an indoor arena in Kokkola, Finland.  The arena was built in 1988 and has a capacity of 5500 and can seat 4200 spectators for ice hockey matches. It is the home arena for Kokkolan Hermes of the Mestis hockey league the second top league in Finland behind Liiga. The arena's hall also has a boxing hall, athletics space and an indoor shooting range.

References

Indoor arenas in Finland
Indoor ice hockey venues in Finland
Kokkola